Los miserables is a Mexican telenovela produced by Imevisión (now TV Azteca) for Canal 13 in 1974. It was led by Sergio Bustamante and Diana Bracho, and was based on Victor Hugo's 1862 novel, Les Misérables.

Cast 
 Sergio Bustamante as Jean Valjean
 Diana Bracho as Cosette
 Antonio Passy as Javert 
 Magda Guzmán as Mrs. Thernardier 
 Carlos Ancira as Thernardier 
 María Rojo as Eponina 
 Blanca Sánchez as Fantine
 Luis Torner as Mario
 Edith González as young Cosette
 Fernando Soler as Gillenormand
 Ángel Garasa as Bishop Myriel
 Alejandro Ciangherotti as Fauchelevent
 Marilú Elízaga as Senorita Gillenormand
 Alicia Palacios as Sor Perpetua
 Alicia Montoya as Mother Abbess
 Héctor Bonilla as Gerard (Enjolras)
 Raul Izaguirre as Teodulo 
 Enrique Novi as Luis (Combeferre)
 Otto Sirgo as Felix Tholomyes
 Socorro Avelar as Celadora

See also
 Adaptations of Les Misérables

References

External links 

1974 telenovelas
TV Azteca telenovelas
Works based on Les Misérables
Mexican telenovelas
1974 Mexican television series debuts
1974 Mexican television series endings
Television shows based on French novels
Spanish-language telenovelas